Barak Valley division, is an administrative division of Assam under the jurisdiction of a Commissioner, who is stationed at Silchar the largest city of the division. It consists of the following districts: Cachar, North Cachar Hills, Karimganj, and Hailakandi.

Districts
Barak valley Division & Hills comprises four districts, namely Cachar, North Cachar Hills, Karimganj, and Hailakandi.

Demographics
Barak Valley Division have a population of 3,838,701 with constituting 4 districts in total.

Languages

As per (2011) language census report, Bengali is the official as well as the most spoken language of the region with approximately 2,930,378 native speakers. Hindi, Manipuri, Bishnupriya and Dimasa are the next most widely spoken languages with 362,459, 126,498, 50,019 and 21,747 native speakers, respectively. Tripuri, Odia, Nepali and Marwari are also spoken by a considerable minority, while 2.43% of the total population speaks other tribal languages.

According to census 2011, the major languages of Cachar district are Bengali, Hindi, Manipuri, Bhojpuri, Bishnupriya Manipuri, Dimasa, Khasi, Hmar and Odia in descending order of population. In the Hailakandi district, the major languages are Bengali, Hindi, Tripuri language, Manipuri and Bhojpuri. In the Karimganj district, the major languages are Bengali and Hindi.

Dimasa and Bengali are the main lingua franca in the Dima Hasao.

Religion

Hinduism, is the slight majority religion in the Barak Valley & Cachar Hills Division. The religious composition of the valley & hills population is as follows: Hindus 50.94%, Muslims 45.57%, Christians 3.16%, and others 0.33%. Hindus are the majority in Cachar district (59.8%) with having (86.3%) Hindu in the district headquarter ; Silchar (which is also the main city of the valley), while Dima Hasao is (67.1%) Hindu, with significant Christian population (29.57%).
While Muslims are the majority in Hailakandi district (60.3%) and Karimganj district (56.4%), but Hailakandi town have (67.3%) Hindu majority, Karimganj town have also a Hindu Majority of (86.6%) as of 2011 census.

See also
Upper Assam Division
Lower Assam Division
North Assam Division
Central Assam Division

References

Divisions of Assam